Gauri Malla is a Nepali actress.  In 2002, she was awarded Nepal's "Motion Picture Award" for best leading female.  In 2003, she won the "Best Supporting Actress Award" at the first ever Lux Film Awards in Nepal. She is one of the Judge of Dancing with stars season 1 Nepal.

In 2002, she was awarded Nepal's "Motion Picture Award" and in 2003, she won the "Best Supporting Actress Award. She later moved to USA. She has returned Nepal in 2014 from United States.

Filmography

Television

References

External links

Mithila Sharma
Basundhara Bhusal

Living people
Actors from Kathmandu
Nepalese film actresses
Nepalese television actresses
Actresses in Nepali cinema
Actresses in Nepali television
Nepalese female models
20th-century Nepalese actresses
1952 births